Koenig-Warthausen or König-Warthausen is a German surname. Notable people with the surname include:

 Friedrich Karl von Koenig-Warthausen (1906–1986), German aviator and nobleman
 Richard von König-Warthausen (1830–1911), German ornithologist and nobleman